The Razer Switchblade is a concept design of a portable gaming device developed by Razer. It was first unveiled on January 5, 2011 at the Consumer Electronics Show (CES). The Switchblade won The Best of CES 2011 People's Voice award.

The Switchblade's main goal is to provide gamers with the functionality of a Windows computer, combined with the portability of a handheld device. It features a multitouch LCD screen and an adaptive keyboard that changes keys depending on the game being played.

Development 
In 2009, Razer sec hired a team of engineers who used to work for Apple, HP, and Dell. They started a project, codenamed the "Switchblade", which is a portable gaming device that "would revolutionize the future of gaming". When asked about the development of the Switchblade, Razer's CEO, Min-Liang Tan, believed that the development of the Switchblade started from a small gaming peripheral company, into a well-known corporation that would develop the first full portable PC gaming console. He said "Razer isn't just about bringing innovation to the PC, but creating products that will change the future of gaming. The Razer Switchblade is one such product."

Although the current development of the Switchblade hinted that it might be priced about 250-600 Dollars, Razer says that the final product might not look anything like its current prototype. 

As of 2023, Razer doesn't support app development of Switchblade UI.

Features

External appearance 
The Razer Switchblade has a traditional netbook form factor. When compared to a standard Nintendo DS the Switchblade's dimensions are only slightly larger. When the lid is folded, the Switchblade is 172mm x 115mm x 25 mm. The Razer Switchblade is about 7mm thicker than the MacBook Air when folded. On the outside, the Switchblade is completely black except for the green Razer logo in the middle. The weight of the product is currently unknown to the public.

Internal appearance 
The Switchblade opens up and closes like a notebook computer. The monitor is a multitouch LCD screen and is measured 7 inches across diagonally. On the right edge of the Switchblade is an AC input and mini HDMI output port, which is able to connect to a monitor for display with an HDMI cable. On the left edge is a standard full sized USB 3.0 port. On the bottom of the keyboard are standard headphone and microphone jacks.  The top of the monitor is embedded with a built in webcam.

Keyboard 
The famed component of the Switchblade is its revolutionary keyboard. The Switchblade's keyboard is standard to a 7-inch netbook, meaning that not a lot of keys are able to fit on the keyboard. However, each transparent plastic key has tiny OLED screens under it, similar to the idea conceptualized by the Optimus Maximus keyboard. Its dynamic interface changes key binds depending on what game the user is playing. When a video game is executed, the Switchblade intelligently recognizes the game's interface, such as the controls, colour schemes, and command icons. It implements this information right into the keys itself, allowing for multiple profiles and setups for the same game. The user may choose which setup to use for different situations and remove keys that the user does not use. This adaptability compensates for the small number of keys on the Switchblade, allowing for a nearly infinite number of possible keyboard layouts.

Software and usage 
The Switchblade will be running Windows 7 with x86 architecture. This allows for a wide variety of programs to be compatible with the Switchblade, such as word processing (Microsoft Word), internet browsing (Internet Explorer), etc. Furthermore, the Switchblade features a touchscreen monitor which allows for the functionality of a tablet, making multimedia and web browsing experiences even better. This also eliminates the need for a touchpad or mouse.

Gaming is the Switchblade's forte. Since it runs on Windows 7, multiple games have been already played for demonstration such as Quake, WoW, and Defense of the Ancients. It is programmed to serve the needs of all genres of games. Razer quotes, "The combination of the new dynamic tactile keyboard, a multi-touch-screen and, if required, a mobile gaming mouse, allows for the full desktop PC gaming experience and more." The Switchblade will most likely be equipped standard with 802.11 WiFi and Bluetooth, while more expensive models will have 3G network compatibility.

Criticism 
The Switchblade is currently still in the prototype stage. Razer is constantly adding and removing features to the Switchblade. However, critics have high hopes for the Switchblade. Brad Graff, director of gaming platforms for Intel's Ultra Mobility group says that "PC gaming continues to attract innovation with rich 3D graphics, high-definition video, and lifelike animation...The Intel Atom processor, combined with Razer's expertise in bringing gaming solutions to market, will help make it possible for consumers to have a powerful gaming experience in mobile devices." Scott Stein of CNet says that "We'd like to be optimistic [for the future of the Switchblade], but we've haven't yet seen an Atom Netbook that's offered anything close to the experience of a regular PC gaming laptop. The 11.6-inch Alienware M11x came close, but also utilized Nvidia GeForce graphics and a midlevel Intel Core CULV processor to accomplish the task."

The first public display of the Switchblade is in the Razer booth at CES. Despite the fact that the Switchblade's development has been revealed to the public for only a couple of months, it has already won the CES 2011 People's Voice Award.

Gaming enthusiasts are rather sceptical of the future of the Switchblade. They say that online gaming is not as efficient without an ethernet port. The lack of multiple USB ports may also prove to be a problem as only one other wired peripheral can be connected to the Switchblade at a time. Users who wanted to connect a wired mouse and keyboard at the same time would need to purchase an additional USB hub. However, built-in Bluetooth connectivity would mitigate this limitation as any devices connected this way would not use a USB port.

Specifications 
 Available Colours: Black
 Size: 172 × 115 × 25 mm
 Weight: Currently Unknown
 Battery Life: 4-6 Hours of Gameplay
 Maximum Resolution: 1024 × 600 (Limited by Atom processor)
 Ports: 1 USB 3.0, 1 Headphone, 1 Microphone, 1 AC power Input, 1 mini HDMI Output
 Integrated Features: Integrated Webcam, Built-In 802.11 Wifi, Bluetooth, 3G

References

External links
 

Handheld personal computers
Upcoming products